Spillman Creek is a stream in Lincoln County, Kansas, in the United States.

Spillman Creek was named in the 1850s for a pioneer named Spillman.

See also
List of rivers of Kansas

References

Rivers of Lincoln County, Kansas
Rivers of Kansas